This article is a list of countries by organic farmland.

As of 2020, approximately  worldwide were farmed organically, representing approximately 1.6% of total world farmland.

Countries and territories 
All areas are given in hectares. Source: FIBL

Biodynamic farmland 
Biodynamic agriculture is practiced in 55 countries, with a world total of 251,842 certified biodynamic hectares. With Europe dominating the world map.
All areas are given in hectares. Source: American Institute of Science.

Notes

References 

Geography-related lists
Lists by area
Organic Farmland
Organic farming